K35DG-D, virtual and UHF digital channel 35, branded on-air as UCSD TV, was a low-powered, Class A UCTV-affiliated television station licensed to San Diego, California, United States. The station was owned by the University of California San Diego. On cable, the station was carried on Spectrum digital channel 1231 and Cox digital channel 135. Their transmitter was located atop Mount Soledad.

History

In the Federal Communications Commission (FCC)'s incentive auction, K35DG-D sold its spectrum for $24,020,383; at the time, the station indicated that it would enter into a post-auction channel sharing agreement. K35DG-D ceased operations October 25, 2017, and its license was surrendered to the FCC for cancellation on October 27, 2017; UCSD TV continues to be carried on Cox, Spectrum, and AT&T.

Programming

The channel aired public lectures, as well as documentaries and fine arts programming from UCTV, with black-and-white movies on Saturdays.

See also
 University of California Television

References

External links
UCSD TV
Fybush.com: Mount Soledad (includes K35DG)

Educational and instructional television channels
University of California, San Diego
35DG-D
Television channels and stations established in 1997
Low-power television stations in the United States
1997 establishments in California
Television channels and stations disestablished in 2017
2017 disestablishments in California
Defunct television stations in the United States
35DG-D